Phong Điền may refer to several places in Vietnam, including:

Phong Điền District, Cần Thơ
Phong Điền District, Thừa Thiên-Huế Province
Phong Điền, Cần Thơ, a township and capital of Phong Điền District, Cần Thơ
Phong Điền, Thừa Thiên-Huế, a township and capital of Phong Điền District, Thừa Thiên-Huế Province
Phong Điền, Cà Mau, a commune of Trần Văn Thời District